Lac de Grand-Lieu is a lake located to the southwest of Nantes, in the Loire-Atlantique, France, and almost entirely in Saint-Philbert-de-Grand-Lieu.

The lake is classified as a Local Nature Reserve, and use of boats on the lake are prohibited for all but a small number of licensed professional fishermen.

Tourism 
Due to the lake classification, as a protected area, its access is restricted. Navigation on the lake is prohibited; only seven professional fishermen have been granted specific authorisation to do so. Because of its shallow topography, and its wild vegetation, the lake is difficult to access. Except during the winter floods, it is only accessible from a few locations, such as at Bouaye in the north, at Pierre Aigüe in Saint-Aignan-Grandlieu and la Chevrolière in the east.

For visitors, a museum has been created to present the lake and its ecosystem as well as the history of local fishermen. An observatory allows tourists to have a look at the wildlife in its natural habitat.

An exhibition on the lake is offered at The lake House at Grand-lieu in Bouaye and a tour is also available at The old Guerlain Pavillon which overlooks the lake.

Historic

Prehistory and antiquity 
In the site the soil was formed about 50 million years, the current topography around two millions years ago, and the transformation of the current landscape took shape during the Neolithic period. 
Six thousand years ago the areas which had not been filled by the sand were covered by a dense forest. The deposits of this forest build over time and it is today the fifth largest in France. It contains around 29 million cubic meters of peat. The bottom of the lake is composed of various deposits and their thickness can reach about thirty meters. Aquifers containing fresh water have been formed in these layers. An analysis at carbon 14 has been used to date that water, the result showed that is water would be locked up for 8 700 years.

Middle ages 
Before the creation of a piping work during the 18th century, the water of the lake was released via the large swamp close to the island of Couetils, then join the course of the Tenu river which cross this zone before reaching the large Loire river. The zone where the junction with The Tenu occur was made close to the island Marguerite (area which was originally called the three channels)

During the system of feudalism, the lake was owned by the lordship of Grand-Lieu. After 851 AB, under the Breton rule, the lake was placed under the Royal guardianship and then under the duke tutorship. In 1145, Conan III duke of Brittany gives his right to the monks from the Abbey of Buzay. They will keep the rights for around 150 years, which also included the right to fish. They then decided to concede those right to the lord De Vieillevigne, for an annual rent of seven livres. From 1387 the rent has stopped  The Machecoul-Gastineau then take possession of the rights which they do not have and expropriate the property title

The control of this domain, with the absence of firm land, is not without consequences: the population around the city of Nantes receive fresh water fish from the lake. The lord are given a right of “Water”, which means they have the right to fish with a large fishing net, which allows them to catch the fish in very large quantity

Modern times 
After the Middle ages, during the modern times, the population living around the lake were the victims of the frequent flood. It is during the 18th century that human greatly changed the life of the lake, with the construction of different channel   .In the north the construction of The Acheneau canal will make the regulation of the flows possible. The name Acheneau originates from the French work chenal which in the English language means channel. The Acheneau leaves from the north of the lake, joins the course of the Tenu, and then goes towards the Loire.

After the French revolution 
In 1809, the Comte August de Juigne, who is the holder of the rights on the lake, project to drain and dry it in order to use it to grow crops. At that time is type of initiative was common, relying on the economic argument but also on the problem related to health that wetlands can bring to the close population.

The Juigne family will, from there, try fiercely to carry out this project, which will be briefly threaten by the French Revolution but the family lordship right will ended be maintained. In 1844, the owner of the lac are the Juigne family, Louis de Saint-Aignan’ family, the family Juchault des Jamonieres and the Comte Antoine d'Eserot d’Estrée.

The project then faces the population living around the lac. During the 19th century the future of the lac is decided by the confrontation between the Comte de Juigne and the syndicate of the Buzay channel run by local public figure     The Comte also has to work against people who grant, illegally, part of the lake for themselves. He does not hesitate for instance to conduct an action against the Jamonières’ family. His project is to dry out part of the land in the hope to sell them as farmlands, he hopes to get back around three thousands hectares.

At the end of the 18th century, Gustave Juigné who succeeded his father , also plan to conduct a drainage of the lake, but this time he encounters an intervention from Gustave Roch, the "Loire-Inférieure" deputy. The parliament decided to open a report on the public domain, and the Council decided that the question of the lake ownership could only be decided by the Justice. This rebound puts an end on the Juigné project

Gallery

References

Grand Lieu
Landforms of Loire-Atlantique
Ramsar sites in Metropolitan France